The Capitan O'Brien class were three submarines built for the Chilean Navy in the late 1920s. They were similar to the contemporary British s, but mounted a larger /45 deck gun and were slightly smaller.

Ships

All boats were built by Vickers in Barrow-in-Furness and commissioned in 1929.  The builder's photograph of the Simpson gives the dimensions as  overall ×  × , surface speed  surfaced and  submerged.

The two s purchased by Chile in the 1970s were also known locally as the O'Brien class.

References

Cited works
 Conway's All the World's Fighting Ships 1922-1946
 

Submarine classes